Jože is a male given name related to Joseph. Notable people with this name include:

 Jože Babič (1917–1996), Slovenian film, theatre and television director
 Jože Benko (born 1980), Slovenian football striker
 Jože Berc (born 1944), Slovenian rower
 Jože Bertoncelj (1922–2012), Slovenian alpine skier
 Jože Brilej (1910–1981), diplomat, politician, ambassador, colonel
 Jože Brodnik (born 1936), Slovenian decathlete
 Jože Ciuha (1924–2015), Slovenian painter
 Jože Dežman (born 1955), Slovenian historian
 Jože Flere (born 1968), Paralympian athlete from Slovenia
 Jože Gazvoda (born 1949), Slovenian alpine skier
 Jože Gerkman, Yugoslav slalom canoeist
 Jože Humer (1936–2012), Slovenian musician
 Jože Ilija (1928–1983), Slovenian slalom canoeist
 Jože Javoršek (1920–1990), Slovenian author
 Jože Klemenčič (born 1962), Slovenian cross-country skier
 Jože Knific (born 1915), Slovenian cross-country skier
 Jože Kolman (born 1967), Slovenian gymnast
 Jože Kovač (born 1961), Yugoslavian athlete
 Jože Kuralt (1956–1986), alpine skier
 Jože Mehle (born 1980), Slovenian cross-country skier
 Jože Melaher, Yugoslav military officer
 Jože Mencinger (born 1941), Slovenian  politician
 Jože Međimurec (born 1945), Slovenian middle-distance runner
 Jože Možina (born 1968), Slovenian historian, sociologist and journalist
 Jože Pahor (1888–1964), Slovene writer, playwright, editor and journalist
 Jože Pirjevec (born 1940), Slovene-Italian historian
 Jože Plečnik (1872–1957), Slovene architect
 Jože Pogačnik (1932–2016), Slovenian film director and screenwriter
 Jože Poklukar (born 1973), Slovenian biathlete
 Jože Prelogar (born 1959), Slovenian football player and manager
 Jože Privšek (1937–1998), musician
 Jože Pučnik (1932–2003), Slovenian politician
 Jože Smole (born 1965), Yugoslav cyclist
 Jože Snoj (born 1934), Slovenian author
 Jože Toporišič (1926–2014), Slovene linguist
 Jože Vadnov (born 1912), Slovenian gymnast
 Jože Valenčič (born 1948), Yugoslav cyclist
 Jože Vidmar (born 1963), Slovenian slalom canoeist
 Jože Vrtačič (born 1980), Slovenian sprinter
 Jože Zidar (1927–2012), Slovenian ski jumper
 Jože Šlibar (born 1934), Yugoslav ski jumper
 Jože Šmit (1922–2004), Slovene poet, translator, editor and journalist

Slovene masculine given names